Foujia Huda (born 21 February 1985) is a Bangladeshi sprinter. She competed in the women's 100 metres at the 2000 Summer Olympics.

References

External links
 

1985 births
Living people
Athletes (track and field) at the 2000 Summer Olympics
Bangladeshi female sprinters
Olympic athletes of Bangladesh
Place of birth missing (living people)
Athletes (track and field) at the 2006 Asian Games
Asian Games competitors for Bangladesh
Olympic female sprinters